Jeremy Nathans (born July 31, 1958) is a professor of molecular biology and genetics at Johns Hopkins University. He is also a member of the National Academy of Sciences and an investigator of the Howard Hughes Medical Institute.

He is known for first isolating and characterizing the opsin genes contributing to human color vision. In 2020 he was awarded the Benjamin Franklin Medal (Franklin Institute) in Life Science. In 2022 he was awarded the Nemmers Prize in Medical Science.

References

External links

 Website at Department of Molecular Biology & Genetics

1958 births
Living people
Johns Hopkins University faculty
Stanford University alumni
Massachusetts Institute of Technology alumni
American geneticists
Members of the United States National Academy of Sciences
Howard Hughes Medical Investigators
Members of the National Academy of Medicine